Ian Gill is an Australian-Canadian writer, documentary filmmaker, and social entrepreneur. He has been the director of Ecotrust Canada since 1994. Before that he worked as a reporter for the Canadian Broadcasting Corporation.

Gill was president and founder of Ecotrust Canada from 1994 to 2010, when he was appointed founding Executive Director of Ecotrust Australia. Gill served for over five years as a director of Vancity credit union. and currently serves as a director of Vancouver Writers Fest literary festival.

He writes for publications in Canada and North America including The Tyee, Alberta Views, and Policy Options.

Works

Books
 Hiking on the Edge: Canada's West Coast Trail (1995)
 Haida Gwaii: Journeys Through the Queen Charlotte Islands (1997)
 All That We Say Is Ours: Guujaaw and the Reawakening of the Haida Nation (2009) (Shortlisted for BC Book Prize and nominated for the Roderick Haig-Brown Regional Book Prize) 
 No News Is Bad News: Canada's Media Collapse - and What Comes Next (2016)

Film
 Confessions of an Innocent Man (writer) (2007), winner of Gemini-award for Best Biography
Other selected titles include:
Transplant Tourism (CBC) (writer) 2003
The Boys of Buchenwald (History Television) (writer) 2002
To Love, Honour and Obey (CTV) 2001
The Life and Times of Dr. Henry Morgentaler (CBC) 1999
The Dealmaker: The Life and Times of Jimmy Pattison (CBC) 1998
The Life and Times of David Suzuki (CBC) 1998
Mordecai: The Life and Times of Mordecai Richler (CBC) 1997
Whisky Man: Inside the Dynasty of Samuel Bronfman (CBC) 1996

References

External links
Ian Gill on  ABC Bookworld

Living people
Canadian non-fiction writers
1955 births